Brinley is a given name and a surname meaning 'burned clearing’. Notable people with the name include:

Given name
Brinley Rees (1919–2004), Welsh academic
Brinley Richards (1904–1981), Welsh language poet, author, Archdruid of the National Eisteddfod of Wales 1972–1975
Brinley Williams (1895–1987), Welsh dual-code international rugby wing
Henry Brinley Richards (1817–1885), Welsh composer

Surname
Bertrand R. Brinley (1917–1994), American writer of short stories and children's tales
Charles Brinley (1880–1946), American actor of the silent era
D. Putnam Brinley (1879–1963), American artist of the modernist school
Godfrey Brinley (1864–1939), tennis player from the United States

See also
Brynlee (given name)
Brinley, Ohio

References